De Le Rue is a French surname. Notable people with the surname include:

 Xavier de Le Rue (born 1979), French snowboarder
 Paul-Henri de Le Rue (born 1984), French snowboarder

See also
 De la Rue (surname)

French-language surnames